Rodrigo Hardy Araújo, commonly known as Rodrigo, (born 7 June 1984), is a Brazilian futsal player who plays for Sorocaba Futsal and the Brazilian national futsal team.

References

External links
FIFA profile
Liga Futsal profile
ACBF profile

1984 births
Living people
Futsal defenders
Brazilian men's futsal players
Sportspeople from Campinas